TMC-647055 is an experimental antiviral drug which was developed as a treatment for hepatitis C, and is in clinical trials as a combination treatment with ribavirin and simeprevir. It acts as a NS5b polymerase inhibitor.

References 

Anti–RNA virus drugs
Antiviral drugs